The 1986 Clásica de San Sebastián was the sixth edition of the Clásica de San Sebastián cycle race and was held on 13 August 1986. The race started and finished in San Sebastián. The race was won by Iñaki Gastón.

General classification

References

Clásica de San Sebastián
San